German submarine U-676 was a Type VIIC U-boat of Nazi Germany's Kriegsmarine during World War II. The submarine was laid down on 13 June 1942 at the Howaldtswerke yard at Hamburg, launched on 6 July 1943, and commissioned on 4 August 1943 under the command of Oberleutnant zur See Werner Sass.

Attached to 5th U-boat Flotilla based at Kiel, U-676 completed her training period on 31 August 1944 and was assigned to front-line service.

Design
German Type VIIC submarines were preceded by the shorter Type VIIB submarines. U-676 had a displacement of  when at the surface and  while submerged. She had two shafts and two  propellers.

U-676 was fitted with five  torpedo tubes (four fitted at the bow and one at the stern), fourteen torpedoes, two  Flak M42 and two twin  C/30 anti-aircraft guns. The boat had a complement of between forty-four and sixty.

Service history

On the second and final patrol, U-676 was last heard of on 12 February 1945 while operating in the Gulf of Finland. In 2012 the wreck of U-676 was detected in position . All 57 crew members perished in the event.

References

Bibliography

External links

German Type VIIC submarines
1943 ships
Ships built in Hamburg
U-boats commissioned in 1943
U-boats sunk in 1945
Maritime incidents in February 1945
Ships lost with all hands
World War II shipwrecks in the Baltic Sea
U-boats sunk by mines
World War II submarines of Germany